Zach Garrett (born April 8, 1995) is a male American recurve archer. He competed in the individual recurve event and the team recurve event at the 2015 World Archery Championships in Copenhagen, Denmark.

Garrett won a silver medal in the men's team archery event at the 2015 Pan American Games. In August 2016, Garrett won a silver medal in Archery at the Summer Olympics in Rio de Janeiro, Brazil.

References

External links
 

American male archers
Living people
Place of birth missing (living people)
1995 births
Archers at the 2015 Pan American Games
Pan American Games silver medalists for the United States
Archers at the 2016 Summer Olympics
Medalists at the 2016 Summer Olympics
Olympic silver medalists for the United States in archery
Pan American Games medalists in archery
Medalists at the 2015 Pan American Games